Ray Evans (1915–2007) was an American songwriter.

Ray Evans may also refer to:

 Ray Evans (Australian businessman) (1939–2014), Australian business leader and campaigner against climate change mitigation efforts
 Ray Evans (halfback) (1922–1999), American football halfback
 Ray Evans (offensive lineman) (1924–2008), American football lineman
 Ray Evans (cartoonist) (1887–1954), American editorial cartoonist
 Ray Evans (footballer, born 1927) (1927–2010), English footballerfor Mansfield Town
 Ray Evans (footballer, born 1929) (1929–2005), English footballer for Crewe Alexandra
 Ray Evans (footballer, born 1933) (1933–2009), English footballer
 Ray Evans (footballer, born 1949), English footballer
 Ray Evans (rugby league) (1930–2017), rugby league footballer of the 1950s
 Ray Evans Seneca Theater, Salamanca, New York

See also
 Raymond Evans (disambiguation)